Víctor Laguardia Cisneros (born 5 November 1989) is a Spanish professional footballer who plays as a central defender for Deportivo Alavés.

Club career

Zaragoza
Laguardia was born in Zaragoza, Aragon. After emerging through hometown Real Zaragoza's youth system he made his first-team – and La Liga – debut on 29 August 2009 in a 1–0 home win against CD Tenerife, but spent the vast majority of his first three seasons as a senior, however, registered with the B side in the Tercera División.

In the summer of 2011, Laguardia was loaned to UD Las Palmas of the Segunda División, in a season-long move. More of the same befell in the following campaign, with AD Alcorcón.

Alavés
Laguardia continued competing in division two the following years, with Zaragoza and Deportivo Alavés. He achieved promotion to the top flight with the latter in 2016, appearing in 39 matches and scoring once.

Laguardia scored his first goal in the Spanish top tier on 1 October 2016, but in a 2–1 away loss to Sevilla FC. During that season he appeared in 31 competitive games for a side that finish ninth and also reached the final of the Copa del Rey for the first time ever, but also suffered a severe knee injury that sidelined him for eight months.

Laguardia left Alavés after his contract expired in July 2022, but returned to the club on 4 October after agreeing to a two-year-deal.

Career statistics

Club

Honours
Alavés
Segunda División: 2015–16

Spain U20
Mediterranean Games: 2009

References

External links

1989 births
Living people
Spanish footballers
Footballers from Zaragoza
Association football defenders
La Liga players
Segunda División players
Tercera División players
Real Zaragoza B players
Real Zaragoza players
UD Las Palmas players
AD Alcorcón footballers
Deportivo Alavés players
Spain youth international footballers
Spain under-21 international footballers
Competitors at the 2009 Mediterranean Games
Mediterranean Games medalists in football
Mediterranean Games gold medalists for Spain